KRBL (105.7 The Red-Dirt Rebel) is a radio station broadcasting a Texas country format. Licensed to Idalou, Texas, United States, it serves the Lubbock area. The station is currently owned by David Walker, through licensee Walker Radio Group LLC.

Following court receivership in 2012, the station concluded its run as Praise Radio 105.7 on March 6, 2013 at 6PM. It was flipped immediately, stunting with an all Beatles format. One week later it re-launched as 105.7 The Edge. The first commercial alternative rock station in the Lubbock market.

The Free Beer and Hot Wings Show served as the morning show during The Edge format, with the rest of the programming done locally.

Keeping in line with other stations owned by Walker Broadcasting & Communications, 105.7 The Edge is one of very few stations that include local bands and musicians in their playlist.

On November 1, 2013 KRBL announced on their Facebook page that they had been approved to boost their ERP to 25,000 watts, greatly expanding their coverage area.

On February 27, 2015 KRBL changed their format from alternative rock (which moved to KJDL 1420 AM) to classic hits, branded as "105.7 King FM". Landon King joined KRBL to serve as Brand Manager & Morning Show Host for King FM. King was previously with KKCL-FM in the Lubbock market for 18 years, leaving in November 2014. Dan Collins, a former morning show host at KKCL-FM (2002-2008), is currently the afternoon DJ on King FM. King FM airs The Mike Harvey Show six nights a week and airs Shallowater High School football games.

On May 25, 2018 KRBL-FM itself began simulcasting on what had been sister Classic Hits “105.7 King-FM” KRBL Idalou and rebranded as “105.7 The Red-Dirt Rebel” on May 25, 2018.

Previous logo

References

External links

RBL
Country radio stations in the United States